Dudley Eustace is a British businessman, having many executive functions in Dutch companies. He is well known for his restructuring work being finance director of Philips and Ahold.
Eustace is currently the Chairman of Aegon and VNU, now called The Nielsen Company. He is also Vice-Chairman of the Supervisory Board of KPN, Vice-Chairman of Hagemeyer and was a member of the Supervisory Board of Stork N.V.

References

Living people
N M Rothschild & Sons people
Year of birth missing (living people)